Brescia Calcio, commonly referred to as Brescia, is an Italian football club based in Brescia, Lombardy, that currently plays in .

The club holds the record for total number of seasons (64) and consecutive seasons (18, from 1947–48 to 1964–65) in Serie B, which they have won four times. Their best finish in Serie A came in the 2000–01 season when they placed eighth. At the beginning of the 21st century, led by the 1993 Ballon d'Or winner Roberto Baggio, the club also qualified for the Intertoto Cup twice, reaching the final in 2001 but being defeated on the away goals rule by Paris Saint-Germain. During this era, Pep Guardiola, future highly decorated manager, also played for the club.

The team's colours are blue and white. Its stadium is the 19,550-seater Stadio Mario Rigamonti. They have a long-standing rivalry with Atalanta from nearby Bergamo.

History
The team was founded in 1911 as Brescia Football Club, joining the Terza Categoria division the same year. In 1913, Brescia was promoted to First Division for its first time ever, and from 1929 it played in Serie A for six of the seven following seasons. Successively, the club played among the two top divisions until 1982, when Brescia was relegated to Serie C1. The club then returned to Serie B in 1985. Brescia played outside the two national tournaments of Lega Calcio (A and B) only four years: under this aspect, only 11 clubs in all Italy marked a better performance.

Brescia won the Anglo-Italian Cup in 1994, the biggest notable achievement in their entire history to date. Brescia actually came to the footballing forefront only in 2000, when the previously unfancied club signed former FIFA World Player of the Year Roberto Baggio, who led Brescia to a seventh-place finish in the 2000–01 season, thus qualifying for the UEFA Intertoto Cup. Successively, Brescia reached the Intertoto Cup finals, then lost to Paris Saint-Germain according to the away goals rule after achieving a 0–0 away draw in the first leg and a 1–1 home draw in the second leg. Baggio spent four years at Brescia before retiring in 2004 and during those historic four years, Brescia became widely known as "Baggio's Brescia". During Baggio's four-year spell with Brescia, the club recorded its best-ever run of staying in Serie A. In the very next season that followed Baggio's retirement (2004–05), however, Brescia were relegated from Serie A on the last day, finishing a lowly 19th. Brescia struggled for returning to top flight after the relegation and finally returned to Serie A after beating Torino with a 2–1 aggregate in the 2009–10 season. In the 2010–11 season, however, they were relegated back to Serie B. In the 2014–15 season, they were relegated to Lega Pro after finishing second from last. However, after Parma's declaration of bankruptcy and demotion to Serie D, Brescia was among the teams selected to replace them in Serie B. A new promotion to Serie A was secured in the 2018–19 season, with two games to spare.

One of the most decorated managers of all time, Mircea Lucescu, the Romanian Gheorghe Hagi, striker Luca Toni, Barcelona's icon playmaker Pep Guardiola, Brescian striker Mario Balotelli and playmaker Andrea Pirlo – born in Brescia – have also spent time playing for the club.

Colours and badge

Colours and kit
The first Brescia kit in 1911 was blue (the national colour) with a thick white vertical stripe down the middle, a design which has returned for the centenary season in 2011. The first appearance of a white "V" was in 1927; added so that the team could use Stadium, the newly built home of another team, Virtus. This style remained until 1940 when the "V" was removed and a plain blue shirt was used.

Some substantial changes after World War II saw the shirt become plain white with blue shorts. This was short-lived and, in 1954, the plain blue shirt returned. The white "V" also returned eventually in 1961 as a show of goodwill by the new chairman at the time.

The "V" disappeared again in 1969; replaced by a diagonal white sash, and returned, but much smaller, in 1974 for two years. The "V" was situated over the heart with the inclusion of the lioness, the symbol of the city of Brescia. The shirt remained plain blue until 1991, when the "V" returned and has been used ever since.

Badge

The first badge appeared on Brescia kits in the 1980s; a blue crest with a golden outline featuring a lion. The city of Brescia is known as Leonessa d'Italia (the Lioness of Italy) after ten days of popular uprising that took place in the city in the spring of 1849 against Austrian rule.

The crest was changed for the centenary of Brescia Calcio in 2011, featuring higher visibility, leaves, and a substantial redesign of the old logo.

The thick profile of the gold shield and laurel branches surrounding the badge are in pure celebration of achieving 100 years of age. The lettering has changed in favour of a font in the style of the period when the team was founded.

The Lion that, due to a misunderstanding of history, many believe to be a lioness (the definition of Leonessa d'Italia was assigned to Brescia following the uprisings, but the lion as a symbol of Brescia dates back to the Republic of Venice), has undergone a total redesign which aims to fix some errors in heraldic iconography (the absence of nails, muscle weakness and weak curvature of the tail) and to restore a more toned and ferocious looking lion, the symbol a football team should have.

Seasons

Stadium

The first ground at which football was played in Brescia was Campo Fiera, where the English workers at the Tempini plant played on their breaks.

In 1911, in the wake of enthusiasm following the foundation of the new club, it is thought a fenced ground was built shortly after on Via Milano.

In 1920 came the opening of the new ground on Via Cesare Lombroso, Brescia, which was used by the team until 1923. From 1923 until 1959, the team had moved into a more modern and larger facility located at Porta Venezia (then Via Naviglio), built for the town's sports club Virtus and called "Stadium".

It was in 1956 that the municipality had the idea to move the club to a stadium more suited to host the matches of the new Serie B.

They began the renovation and construction of the stands to the existing ground at Via Giovanni Novagani. This was completed in 1959 and Brescia began to play their home games in the new Mario Rigamonti stadium (named after the Torino player, Mario Rigamonti, who died in the Superga air disaster).

Over the years, the stadium has undergone several refurbishments (construction of roofing, press room, etc.), the most significant of which was in 2007 with the installation of new security measures.

Players

Current squad

Out on loan

Retired numbers

Technical staff

Notable players
See .

Notable managers
See .

Honours
 Serie B:
 Winners (4): 1964–65, 1991–92, 1996–97, 2018–19
 Serie C/C1:
 Winners (2): 1938–39, 1984–85

Other Titles
 Coppa dell'Amicizia:
 Winners (1): 1967
 Anglo-Italian Cup:
 Winners (1): 1993–94
 Nova Supersports Cup
 Winners (1): 2000

Divisional movements

Shirt sponsors and manufacturers

In Europe

UEFA Intertoto Cup

References

External links

Brescia's official website 

 
Football clubs in Lombardy
Sport in Brescia
Association football clubs established in 1911
Italian football First Division clubs
Serie A clubs
Serie B clubs
Serie C clubs
1911 establishments in Italy